This is a character list of the Canadian animated series, Jimmy Two-Shoes.

Main Characters

Jimmy Two-Shoes
(Cory Doran) - James “Jimmy” Two-Shoes is the eponymous protagonist of the cartoon. He is a perpetually optimistic, thrill-seeking 14-year-old human boy. Jimmy is tall, has blonde hair and a gap in his teeth. He wears a light green shirt and a pair of blue jeans. He has a mission to spread happiness to Miseryville, which makes him a source of irritation to Lucius Heinous VII, whom Jimmy nicknames "Lucy". He is often seen doing extreme activities despite Heloise's warnings. Jimmy is also distracted very easily and always thinks he can make anything fun. One of Jimmy's favorite things to do is hang out with his best friends Beezy and Heloise. He often acts before he thinks. In "Catalogue of Misery" it is shown he may have financial problems. Jimmy also has the courage and will quickly step into a life-threatening situation to help people. His superhero identity is Power Squid, in which he dons a squid-based "muscle enhancer" invented by Heloise, with a set of purple gloves and a mask. His main powers are shooting ink from the squid's tentacles and he can use the tentacles as an extra pair of arms.

Jimmy is also oblivious and slow-minded to the fact that Heloise has a crush on him, even when she tries to make it obvious, somewhat because whenever she tries to do something nice, it always backfires and turns to an evil plan. Jimmy is the only one in Miseryville who isn't afraid of Heloise for his own "reasons". He's the only one that gives her any compassion. However, he has shown some affection for her on several occasions. He was worried about her losing her job in "Catalogue of Misery". He complimented on her dress in "Scent of a Heinous" and he was the only one who wanted to rescue her in "Heinous vs Clown". In "Heloise's Secret Admirer" Jimmy actually seemed to be jealous when he found out that Heloise was dating Peep (Jamie Two-Squirrel) and so he stalked them all day. But it doesn't seem to he really like the idea about Heloise as his girlfriend, in fact he was horrified by the idea they were in love relationship ("Better Sweater"), and even more horrified by the idea of kissing her ("There is Always a Hiccup"). Jimmy is quite gullible and easy to fool. It is shown to be almost impossible to get him upset (some of the only things that make him upset are butterscotch and pickles), and he is rather ignorant of the faults in others. Jimmy sometimes annoys other characters, especially Lucius. Jimmy and Heloise appear to be the only "humans" in Miseryville (no characters have mentioned this in the show). Jimmy apparently hasn't lived in Miseryville for very long, as shown in a few episodes, e.g. he doesn't know about hibernation in 'I Am Jimmy' or didn't know the definition of "grounded" in Miseryville (which literally means being buried to the head-up in the sand and/or dirt).

He owns a pet dog/monster named Cerbee, whose demeanor is very similar to that of regular dogs (in fact, the characters always refer to Cerbee as a dog). Jimmy lived somewhere besides Miseryville and somehow ended up there through a series of events, as he mentions snow to Beezy and Heloise, both of whom are clueless about it, as it had never snowed in Miseryville before. Jimmy's house is between Beezy's and Heloise's. He does not appear to attend school. His catchphrase is "Jimmy, you mad genius!", which he often says when he has an idea. Jimmy's and Heloise's parents are never seen or mentioned. He is a fan of Runny and the Nosebleeds. His name is most likely based on (The History of Little Goody Two Shoes) a story.

Beezy JoJo Heinous
(Brian Froud) - One of Jimmy's best friends, Beezy is a teenage giant, a red, devil-like monster who wears a pair of brown shorts. He is classified as the clueless, lazy, self-centered teenage son of Lucius Heinous the Seventh. He looks somewhat like his father but is much bigger and has a tail. He is one of the bigger monsters in Miseryville, but it is shown in 'Best Prank Ever' that not only a year ago he was the same height as Lucius and Samy. Beezy has been known to play the electric keyboard in "SpewTube" and "A Cold Day in Miseryville".

He would rather hang out with Jimmy and Heloise than spread misery, much to his father's dismay. Lucius is sometimes embarrassed that he's related to him, because of this they have an estranged relationship. He is frequently seen lying on a couch, even outdoors, and constantly uses the phrase "No you are!" as a comeback, even if it doesn't make sense. In season 2, Beezy's new phase is burn! to every insult. Jimmy usually has to feed him just to get his help. Beezy doesn't exactly like Heloise and often tries to play tricks on her but they usually blow up in his face. Beezy and Heloise often fight about who is Jimmy's best friend, Heloise is always teasing him and calling him Sir Lumps-a-Lot as a nickname. In "There's Always a Hiccup" Heloise accidentally runs into Beezy, which results in them accidentally kissing each other (something that they both hated). Some of Beezy's more negative traits were shown in 'Jimmy Matchmaker', such as getting a child to shave his back and licking the back of a random stranger (who, in turn, was licking a brick wall). Beezy also has a girlfriend named Saffi who Jimmy set him up within 'Jimmy Matchmaker' but in 'She Loves Me', Beezy broke up with her. He has also shown that he hates the thought of her dating someone else as seen in 'The Butley Did It'. He is constantly eating, sleeping, or talking on his cell phone. He hates baths and pizza crust. He is also known to pee sitting down shown in 'The Big Drip'. He also likes to flatter himself. In the episode 'The Great Horn Fairy', it was revealed that the 'J.' in his name stands for JoJo.

He apparently runs some kind of business he calls 'Beezy Talent Agency'. His card consists of a poorly made picture of himself with a tuxedo print taped on it and hair scribbled on with a marker. He is apparently the only Heinous not named Lucius. When dressing for a formal event, he adds a white collar with a black bow-tie and white cuffs to his regular clothing. His superhero identity is Spaghetti Beezy, where he simply crams a pot of spaghetti over his head. Beezy uses his noxious garlic breath as his superpower. Beezy also lives in what looks like his father's garage beside Jimmy's house and his father's mansion. Both Beezy's and his father's houses look like skulls. His mother has never been mentioned. He is a fan of Runny and the Nosebleeds. His name is probably derived from Beelzebub.

Heloise
(Tabitha St. Germain) - A super-intelligent yet destructive small girl, Heloise is one of Jimmy's best friends and his second sidekick. She is seen as an evil genius/mad scientist who enjoys spreading chaos wherever she goes, though she has the appearance of a diminutive, charming little girl with highlighted blond hair and dark blue eyes. She is often seen wearing a maroon gown, regardless of location, and has been seen occasionally wearing glasses or shades. She usually wears her hair in a pony-tail and she has a scar on her forehead that is mostly covered by her hair. It is shown that she has feet in "Heloise's Big Secret" and the shape of her legs is briefly shown in "The Terrific Trio," but all of her outfits are full-length and reach the ground, so they've really never been seen. However, she wears pants and shoes in the episode "Something About Herman" so it's proven she has feet.  She apparently does not attend school, instead, she works for Lucius as the head of research and development at Misery, Inc. Her job is to create despair-inducing products for the company. Whenever she tries to scientifically explain her inventions/plans to Jimmy and Beezy she usually has to give a dumbed-down version of the idea so they can understand.

She does have feelings, proven by her crush on Jimmy. In 'Fused Together' she has a shrine dedicated to Jimmy in a small room hidden behind a cabinet that has been "found" by other characters. Her shrine appears again in 'Pet Rocky' (Only this time it's behind the fireplace). She has a hair-trigger, violent temper. She has a crush on Jimmy but doesn't particularly care for Beezy, tolerating him (barely) mainly because of her fondness for Jimmy. Heloise constantly tries to inform her feelings towards Jimmy, but he just doesn't get the message. In 'The Racing Bug' however, she wonders why she likes him (Edward Kay said that Jimmy's good nature appeals to the last shred of humanity in her). She is also shown to be annoyed at Jimmy's constant naivete to obvious problems. In 'Happy Birthday Lucius' she seems very happy and proud of Jimmy for being mean to Lucius. One of her most common lines is "Don't get your horns in a twist", a phrase she often uses when dealing with Lucius. In "A Cold Day in Miseryville" Heloise played the drums while singing with Jimmy and Beezy.

She has shown to envious of other girls who so much as come in contact with Jimmy; once she thought Jez and Jimmy were dating when really he was just trying to helping Lucius. She is shown to be the only character who isn't scared of the weevils. Her age is unclear; she is considerably smaller than Jimmy, but she is hyper-intelligent and has a job. It is supposed that she may be around 15, the same age as Jimmy and Beezy (Edward Kay has said she's older than she looks, however). She does not engage in any 'normal' activity that might indicate her age, although she has been called "little girl" by a few people (including Jimmy) which usually ended up with her getting even. Being nice is impossible for her, no matter how hard she tries, because her evil side always wins over. She is generally in her best mood if she is spending time with Jimmy, particularly if they are alone; however, she can quickly lose her temper if someone intrudes if Jimmy fails to pick up on her affections, or anything that annoys her at all occurs. She seems to be a lifetime resident of Miseryville, as she is completely clueless when Jimmy mentions snow. It is shown that about everyone in Miseryville thinks she's scary. Her superhero identity in "The Terrific Trio" is Trouble Bubble Girl, with whom she dons a pink dress, puts a bubble over her head, turns her hair pink, and floats on a cloud of bubbles. Her superpowers are to launch exploding bubbles at her enemies'. It is shown that Heloise will do whatever it takes to cause misery, especially when it comes to Beezy and Lucius. The only person she ever tries to help is Jimmy. Heloise lives next door to Jimmy, a two-story house with a barbecue in the backyard. She is shown to have ghost issue and she will "smack" any ghosts that she sees. She is a fan of Runny and the Nosebleeds.

Lucius Heinous VII (Originally Lucifer)

(Sean Cullen) - The tyrannical ruler of Miseryville. He resembles a devil-like creature having red skin and horns and is also the father of Beezy J. Heinous. He has great contempt for his archenemy Jimmy, because of his happy-go-lucky attitude which often usually foils his plots to make the town even more miserable (which he takes great joy in doing). He resembles the stereotypical villain as he is cold, malevolent, narcissistic, and self-serving. Lucius seems to think looking gross or smelling bad is a good thing and in 'Clowns Gone Wild' it is shown he owns a pair of underwear that he only washes every 6 months. In "Jimmy in the Big House" Lucius is shown to be the judge and the jury in Miseryville.

Beezy, his son, rebels against his wishes, which he blames Jimmy for. Lucius also has a girlfriend named Jez. He also has a father whom he keeps frozen (along with his ancestors back to Lucius I). He had a miserable childhood and has painful flashbacks of how his father was cruel to him which would explain his bitterness. He's an idiot when it comes to making up new, miserable ideas and relies totally on Heloise's inventions. Which he has been known to inevitably take credit for; but if something goes wrong, he blames Heloise. However, in "There's Always a Hiccup" he designs a dinosaur that terrorizes kids. His exact age is never given, he is at least four hundred years old, as he stated in "Bad Horn Day" that was how long it took his horns to grow, also in "Heinous vs. Clowns," Lucius says that he is "barely seven hundred [years old]." Lucius extremely dislikes the weavils, (as Beezy also has hate towards weavils, one thing he has in common with Lucius) especially their leader Reggie because he stole his stuffed rabbit named 'Coochie Long-Ears'. He is also very short and is an egomaniac which is part of a Napoleon complex. His name is derived from the name Lucifer.

Samuel "Samy" Garvin

(Dwayne Hill) - Lucius's assistant has dreams of stardom and fame. He is rather timid, sensitive, and weak and is often verbally abused by his boss. He resembles a short, goblin creature Who resembles Meerkat In "Pop-Sicles" it is revealed that he also worked for Lucius' father, Lucius Heinous VI for at least 87 years. He is usually assigned to do the most disgusting or dangerous jobs. He speaks with a lateral lisp. When Samy hosts an event he wears a black wig, red suit and uses his ventriloquist puppet Humphrey von Sidekick. It is shown on multiple occasions that he actively dreams of stardom. It is also shown in "Misery Hearts", that he is a best-selling writer. He dislikes Jimmy, Beezy, and Heloise but can tolerate them more than Lucius. Samy is shown sleeping at the end of Lucius' bed in 'Ghostsmackers' which could mean he doesn't own a house. In "The Terrific Trio" Samy got angry at Lucius and turned into a beast until Jimmy, Beezy, and Heloise became heroes to save him. His name is probably derived from Samael. He does not yet have a girlfriend or crushes in the show.

Cerbee

Jimmy's loyal but naughty pet. He is a green, dog-like monster that is supposed to resemble the head of Cerberus (hence the name, though he has only one head instead of three). He loves to eat anything. In "Monster Mutt" he is shown to have a lot of energy when Heloise shoots several tranquilizers into him and shows no signs of being tired (His energy could also explain why he didn't hibernate in 'I Am Jimmy'). Cerbee doesn't seem to like Samy and Beezy very much (Usually biting or even eating them) but he seems to like Heloise and Lucius. In 'Best Bud Battle' he has a dog house which (like many of the other houses in Miseryville) is bigger on the inside than on the outside.

Recurring characters 

 Jez (Valerie Buhagiar) - Lucius's girlfriend who resembles a tall, blue anthropomorphic cat-like creature who has interchangeable noses. She is very selfish and spoiled, and often breaks up or threatens to break up with Lucius if he is unable to please her (an act which is near impossible as she is shown to be very picky). She lives in a white mansion and has a dog named Jasmeen, who once fell in love with Jimmy's dog, Cerbee. Her name is probably derived from Jezebel.
 Lucius Heinous VI (Sean Cullen) - Lucius Heinous VII's father and Beezy's grandfather, whom he keeps frozen in the factory. He obviously doesn't get along with his son, as shown in "Pop-Sicles". In "Jimmy Don't Be a Hero" he says that he's been frozen for twenty years. He is also shown to do a better job at making monsters miserable. Lucius VII got to freeze his father after winning a bowling game against him, shown in "Night in the Heinous Museum" but in every flashback of Lucius Heinous VII, this story of how he got frozen is different. Subsequent episodes, such as "Six Over Seven" and "Heinous on Ice" show Lucius Heinous VI's relationship with his grandson and more significantly his son, has improved.
 Dr. Ludwig Von Scientist (Dwayne Hill) - This is the other mad scientist who lives in Miseryville. He has appeared in many episodes and has helped out Jimmy and Beezy in times when Heloise either would not or was the cause of the problem. It has been said that along with Heloise and two rocks, he is one of the most brilliant minds in all of Miseryville, although Heloise is shown to be much smarter than he is. He is not very evil, which may be because he does not fully understand the concept of being evil, and makes many mistakes, although in "Heads Will Roll" he plays the main antagonist. He is short (though still taller than Heloise) and is shown to be some sort of pale man-like creature with a pointy nose, a mustache that usually covers his mouth, glasses, and a lab coat. He is also shown to be jealous and afraid of Heloise, though he seems to be fond of Jimmy and Beezy. In "Cellphone-itis" it is revealed that he likes to dress like a chicken when he's home alone. He lives on the outskirts of Miseryville on a tall hill beside Molotov's house.
 Saffi (Sunday Muse) - Beezy's girlfriend/ex, an orange, one-eyed, monster-like creature with a simple and feral personality. Saffi always refers to Beezy as "smoothy-smooth". She usually doesn't say many words aside from 'crush' and 'yogurt', but she can talk. She has a hatred of statues and will destroy any that she sees. In fact, the only sentence she spoke in 'Jimmy Matchmaker' was clear, "No, I just hate statues." In "Butley Did It", she also said 'scratchy, scratchy' multiple times. Also, in "I Married a Weavil" she says, "I don't mind" when Beezy is marrying the princess weavil, implying while she does like Beezy, she really does not understand the concept of the word 'girlfriend'. This is further implied in the episode "She Loves Me," when Beezy breaks up with her yet she doesn't seem to understand and simply giggles and jumps up and down joyfully. And in 'Catalog of Misery,' she questions herself on why she is so crazy.
 Dorkus (Dwayne Hill) - He is a small pale creature with brown hair and is Heloise's assistant. He wears a one-lens eyeglass (he only has one eye) and a suit. He seems to be an inventor, except his products aren't near as practical as Heloise's. In 'Power Squid and Spaghetti Beezy,' it is shown that Heloise has a cupboard filled with more duplicates of him which could mean any Dorkus that appear might not be the same one from a previous episode. In "Heloise Schmeloise," it is shown that Dorkus can be very unreliable and lazy as an assistant.
  General Molotov (Dwayne Hill) - A tan Troll Monster resembles Sumatran Orangutan Which is Dickie's Father with pointy ears and a strong build. He works for Lucius and has a young son, a baby daughter, and a wife that intimidates him. In 'A Hair-Brained Idea' he explodes when Jimmy forces him to eat too many cookies (Yet seems to be fine in later episodes). He usually refers to those smaller than him as maggots. He speaks with a Russian accent. His name is probably derived from Moloch or Vyacheslav Molotov.
 Rudolfo (Juan Chioran) - He is a greedy, sly traveling salesman who tries to sell things that don't work or will do anything to make a quick buck. He speaks with a British accent and travels around in a mobile shop on wheels. In "Everyone Can Whistle" it is revealed he has a son named Peep (Jamie Two-Squirrels).
 Peep (Jamie Two-Squirrels) (Christian Potenza) - He is Rudolfo's son and is also a salesman like his Dad. He speaks with a Cockney accent and dresses as a stereotypical street urchin, with tattered and patched up clothes and hat. He first appears in "Everyone Can Whistle" to help Jimmy learn to whistle. He has a crush on Heloise. He also appears in "Heloise's Secret Admirer" when Peep sends Heloise a gift and a note. They spend the day on a date which makes Jimmy jealous. Jimmy didn't like Peep being with Heloise and didn't like the idea of him being her 'boyfriend' either. In his second appearance, his real name is revealed to be Jamie Two-Squirrels.
 Reggie Weavil- (Dwayne Hill) The chief of The Weavils, who live on Mt. Misery. His first appearance was in "Mount Misery". He and Lucius despise each other because of a so-called 'harmless' camp joke; where he took Lucius' bunny 'Coochie Long-Ears' and dropped a bear on him in an outhouse. Which then officially started the Heinous/Weavil feud.
 Xiao - Director of Liu Association, a group of 'Fixers' tasked with solving problems around the city. A fearsome dragon woman constantly surrounded by fire, her first appearance is in the episode "Iron Lotus", where she attempts to kill Jimmy due to mistaking him for a notorious criminal and nearly burns down several city blocks in the process.

Minor characters 

 Lucius's Ancestors- Are the former Rulers of Miseryville before they were frozen by their sons. Lucius the first is seen to be feared by the whole Heinous family because he is seen as the most dangerous, violent, and evil of all the Heinous, he seems to resemble Adolf Hitler in his portrait.
Runny and the Nosebleeds- A rock band which is popular in Miseryville. Jimmy, Beezy, Heloise, and probably all of Miseryville are fans of their music.
 Rodeo Clowns-(Ron Pardo) Evil clowns that hate Jimmy, Beezy, Lucius, and pretty much everyone who isn't a clown. They operate as a ruthless gang in Clownburg, a section of Miseryville, and are very territorial. The clown leader is particularly serious about being a clown and enforcing 'clown power'.
  The Weavils- These weasel like creatures like to con and make a fool out of Lucius, Beezy, and Jimmy (basically everyone except Heloise) with horrible pranks. The head of Weavil is an elder named Reggie. The Weavils have a rivalry with Lucius because they played a prank on him at camp.
 Humphrey von Sidekick- He is Samy's puppet. He only appears when Samy is a host for some event. Like most cartoon ventriloquist dummies, he is occasionally shown, 'The Racing Bug' for example, to have a mind of his own.
 Mrs. Cheese-Breath- An old woman that appears in many episodes, usually just a character in the background. She gets her name from her horrible breath. Although she was Lucius's 3rd-grade teacher she seems to have some sort of odd crush on him, as shown in the episode "Heat Blanket Jimmy", in which she repeatedly asked him for a kiss. She has also tried to kiss Beezy in 'Clowns Gone Wild'.
  The Aaa Guy- A small purple man, who can sound like an entire church choir by himself. He is commonly used to implicate things as heavenly or great. In one of the 'Miseryville Moments' shorts, he is shown going to Heloise for help when he lost his singing voice.
 Jacomo (Sean Cullen) - A tan, stereotypical Italian barber who owns and operates a barbershop in Miseryville. He wears a red-striped barber shirt with a bow-tie and has a stereotypical Italian barber mustache. It is shown he can be pretty lazy when it comes to cutting hair, in "Bad Horn Day" he twice pretends to answer a fake phone call to avoid intricately cutting Jimmy's and Lucius' hair.
 Chuck the Bus-Driver- A corpse with a pink nose and grey skin. He had developed a very odd friendship with Jimmy. He used to be Beezy and Heloise's best friend, but they found him annoying and left him.
 Mrs. Gherkin (Dwayne Hill)- An old lady in the shape of a pickle who first appears in "Rear Pickle". She was a new resident in Jimmy's neighborhood. jimmy came under suspicion that she attacked both Beezy, Heloise, and the Miseryville army when they all went to visit her home. At the end of the episode, she was proven innocent but is then revealed to be an evil pickle monster who is determined to have pickles rule over Miseryville. She appears again in "Zombie Pickle" as the main antagonist, but  Jimmy and Beezy don't seem to recognize her.
 Luigi Pallo- The two-headed Italian gentleman was seen in many episodes. Both heads usually argue with each other. They both have black hair, a long nose, and a bushy mustache.
 Wreckum- A popular Soccer Player that Jimmy, Beezy, and Heloise highly admire. He looks like an anthropomorphic bull or minotaur that speaks in a Scottish accent. His name is an obvious play on David Beckham.
 Shwartzentiger (Sean Cullen)- A ferocious tiger-like creature who loves to talk. He's an extremely deadly and needy creature who loves to socialize with his victims. If they get bored from his endless chattering or try to escape, his normal response would be just to eat them.
 Apple- She is a pink monster with brown hair and wears a purple dress. Her name has only been mentioned in the episode "Scent of a Heinous" this is also the only time she's spoken. She seems to work as a reporter.
 Aunt Pomegranate- Heloise's Aunt. She appears in "What's up with Heloise" when she came for a visit. Her personality and charm can make Heloise behave nice. At the end of the episode, she has reviled to be just as evil and reckless as Heloise. Her nickname for Heloise is "Poppy".
 Tori - He's the son of General Molotov. He gets great enjoyment out of making his little sister spew and only seemed to be jealous of the attention she gets from others. He's become a fan of Runny and the Nosebleeds after Jimmy and Beezy babysat him and his sister. 'Baby Boom' is the only episode where he actually spoke, in other episodes, he usually just appears in the background. He does not have a Russian accent.
  Baby Blamo- General Molotov's baby daughter. She is a very cute and small baby who vomits constantly. She once appeared at her school play as a flower.
 Molotov's Wife (Valerie Buhagiar) - The wife of General Molotov. She is a yellow monster with four arms and four legs who seems to be quite bossy and strict. It is shown in some episodes that she and Molitov may have marriage problems. It's possible she might not be very bright, shown in 'Baby Boom' when she didn't realize the lobster she was talking to was dead. She like her husband speaks in a Russian accent.
 Jasmeen (Tabitha St. Germain) - Jez's dog. She is a small purple dog called a Boohuahua. She once fell in love with Cerbee. At the end of 'Cerbee in Love,' it is shown that she can talk.
 Lava Worm- Basically a thick pink worm with a mouth full of crooked jagged teeth. These creatures are seen throughout the series as more of a running gag than a character. Instead of being one character, the lava worm seems to be an entire species, as it has different voices in each episode. A lava worm is also kind of an insult in Miseryville. In the episode, 'Cold Day in Miseryville', Jimmy says that the last one to the bottom is a dirty lava worm!" and in 'Monster Mutt' Heloise often says "What am I? Some ugly disgusting lava worm?" Often to the dislike to the creature itself.
 Big Lava Worm- A huge worm found at the beaches of Miseryville. They often burst out of the sand headfirst and swallow anyone or anything that's there. A Big Lava Worm called 'Mort' lives under Cerbee's dog house he made a bet with Heloise in "Jimmy in the Big House". He was voiced by Cory Doran.
 Herman- Heloise's temperamental cousin who appears in "Something About Herman". He looks exactly like Heloise except that he wears a cap and has a mustache. Heloise states that he hates pranks and hates to be called "Her-Man" which makes him angry. He becomes an enormous green monster who resembles the Hulk when he is angry.
  Mean Jean- She is a new girl in town who tries to take Heloise's title as 'Queen Of Mean' in the episode Heloise's Rival. She is a girly, spoiled, ugly, ruthless little rich girl with red poofy hair, one eye, and wears a pink dress with a bow. She is shown to be smart and witty as Heloise but their difference is that Heloise is sensitive while Jean is insensitive. Jean buys friends (like what she did with Jimmy) and doesn't like to take "no" for an answer.
 Jimmy One-Shoe: A demon with only one leg who dresses like Jimmy.
 Mr. Ten- He makes an appearance in " The Mysterious Mr. Ten". He would not laugh at anything Jimmy tried because he believes Heloise had put a curse on him a long time back. After all, she thought his laugh was annoying.

References
 

 Lists of characters in Canadian television animation

es: Jimmy Two-Shoes#Personajes